Sérgio Antônio Borges Júnior (born 4 August 1986, in Contagem), commonly known as Serginho, is a Brazilian footballer who most recently played as a defensive midfielder for Confiança

Club career
Serginho was born in Contagem, Minas Gerais. A Villa Nova youth graduate, he moved to Atlético Mineiro in 2006, and made his senior debuts in the following year's Campeonato Mineiro.

Serginho made his Série A debut on 21 July 2007, in a 0–4 away defeat to Vasco da Gama. After a short loan spell at CRB, he established himself as a starter for Galo, and scored his first professional goal on 24 August 2008, netting the first in a 4–0 home routing of Atlético Paranaense.

On 27 May 2013 Serginho was loaned to fellow top division club Criciúma, until the end of the year. On 14 January of the following year he extended his loan for a further season.

On 23 January 2015 Serginho joined Vasco, in a season-long loan deal.

On 10 May 2018, Serginho helped Akhisar Belediyespor win their first professional trophy, the 2017–18 Turkish Cup.

Career statistics

Honours
Atlético Mineiro
Campeonato Mineiro: 2007, 2010, 2012, 2013

Akhisarspor
 Turkish Cup (1): 2017-18
 Turkish Super Cup: 2018

References

External links

1986 births
Living people
People from Contagem
Brazilian footballers
Brazilian expatriate footballers
Association football midfielders
Clube Atlético Mineiro players
Criciúma Esporte Clube players
CR Vasco da Gama players
Sport Club do Recife players
Campeonato Brasileiro Série A players
Al-Wasl F.C. players
Akhisarspor footballers
Coritiba Foot Ball Club players
Süper Lig players
UAE Pro League players
Campeonato Brasileiro Série B players
Brazilian expatriate sportspeople in the United Arab Emirates
Brazilian expatriate sportspeople in Turkey
Expatriate footballers in the United Arab Emirates
Expatriate footballers in Turkey
Sportspeople from Minas Gerais